Christopher Peterson (February 18, 1950 – October 9, 2012) was the Arthur F. Thurnau professor of psychology and organizational studies at the University of Michigan in Ann Arbor, Michigan and the former chair of the clinical psychology area. He was science director of the VIA Institute on Character, and co-author of Character Strengths and Virtues for the classification of character strengths. He was a member of the Positive Psychology Steering Committee and the International Positive Psychology Association board of directors, a senior fellow at the Positive Psychology Center and a lecturer for the Master of Applied Positive Psychology program at the University of Pennsylvania. He was a co-editor of Applied Psychology: Health and Well-being and the Positive Psychology Book Series Editor for Oxford University Press.

He is noted for his work in the study of optimism, health, character, well-being and one of the founders of positive psychology. He has published over 300 academic publications. In 2003 the Institute for Scientific Information (ISI) named him among the 100 most frequently cited psychologists in the past 20 years. In 2010, Dr. Peterson won the 2010 Golden Apple Award for Outstanding Teaching – the most prestigious teaching award at the University of Michigan.

Bibliography includes

 Character Strengths and Virtues: A Handbook and Classification, by Christopher Peterson & Martin E.P. Seligman
 Peterson, C., & Seligman, M.E.P. (2002). The VIA classification of strengths. Cincinnati: Values in Action Institute
A Primer in Positive Psychology, by Christopher Peterson (Textbook). 2006
 Peterson, C., Maier, S.F., & Seligman, M.E.P. (1993). Learned helplessness: A theory for the age of personal control. New York: Oxford.
 Peterson, C., & Bossio, L.M. (1991). Health and optimism. New York: Free Press. 
 Peterson, Christopher; Seif, Aliakbar; Jahangiri, Hamideh (2020). ''Psychology The Past To Present  (2 Volumes), volume 1  volume 2  Scholar’s Press.

References 

20th-century American psychologists
Psychology educators
2012 deaths
Positive psychologists
University of Michigan faculty
1950 births